Henri Lefèbvre (19 December 1905 – 11 June 1970) was a French wrestler who competed in the 1928 Summer Olympics.

References

External links
 

1905 births
1970 deaths
Olympic wrestlers of France
Wrestlers at the 1928 Summer Olympics
French male sport wrestlers
Olympic bronze medalists for France
Olympic medalists in wrestling
Medalists at the 1928 Summer Olympics